In solar physics, a solar particle event (SPE), also known as a solar energetic particle (SEP) event or solar radiation storm, is a solar phenomenon which occurs when particles emitted by the Sun, mostly protons, become accelerated either in the Sun's atmosphere during a solar flare or in interplanetary space by a coronal mass ejection shock. Other nuclei such as helium and HZE ions may also be accelerated during the event. These particles can penetrate the Earth's magnetic field and cause partial ionization of the ionosphere. Energetic protons are a significant radiation hazard to spacecraft and astronauts.

Description 
SPEs occur when charged particles in the Sun's atmosphere are accelerated to extremely high velocities. These charged particles, referred to as solar energetic particles, can escape into interplanetary space where they follow the interplanetary magnetic field.

When solar energetic particles interact with the Earth's magnetosphere, they are guided by the Earth's magnetic field towards the north and south poles where they can penetrate into the upper atmosphere.

Cause 
The physical mechanism behind the acceleration of solar energetic particles leading up to SPEs is currently debated. However, SPEs can generally be divided into two classes

Gradual events
Gradual SPEs are thought to involve the acceleration of particles by shocks driven by coronal mass ejections in the upper corona. They are associated with type II radio bursts and are characterized by elemental abundances, charge states, and temperatures similar to that of the ambient corona. These events produce the highest particle intensities near Earth.

Impulsive events
Impulsive SPEs are thought to involve the acceleration of particles mostly by processes associated with magnetic reconnection and wave-particle interactions at the locations of solar flares. They are associated with short-duration flare emissions at low altitudes and type III radio bursts. They are less intense near Earth than gradual events.
An additional hybrid class has been identified which involves characteristics of both gradual and impulsive events.

Terrestrial effects 
Protons accelerated during an SPE normally have insufficient energy to penetrate the Earth's magnetic field. However, during unusually strong flares, protons can be accelerated to sufficient energies to reach the Earth's magnetosphere and ionosphere around the north pole and south pole.

Polar cap absorption events 
Energetic protons that are guided into the polar regions collide with atmospheric constituents and release their energy through the process of ionization. The majority of the energy is extinguished in the extreme lower region of the ionosphere (around 50–80 km in altitude). This area is particularly important to ionospheric radio communications because this is the area where most of the absorption of radio signal energy occurs. The enhanced ionization produced by incoming energetic protons increases the absorption levels in the lower ionosphere and can have the effect of completely blocking all ionospheric radio communications through the polar regions. Such events are known as polar cap absorption events. These events commence and last as long as the energy of incoming protons at approximately greater than 10 MeV (million electron volts) exceeds roughly 10 pfu (particle flux units or particles sr−1 cm−2 s−1) at geosynchronous satellite altitudes.

Ground level enhancements 

Extremely intense SPEs capable of producing energetic protons with energies in excess of 100 MeV can increase neutron count rates at ground levels through secondary radiation effects. These rare events are known as ground level enhancements (or GLEs). Some events produce large amounts of HZE ions, although their contribution to the total radiation is small compared to the level of protons.

Hazards

Humans 
High altitude commercial transpolar aircraft flights have measured increases in radiation during SEPs, but a warning system is in place that limits these effects by alerting pilots to lower their cruising altitudes. Aircraft flights away from the polar regions are far less likely to see an impact from SPEs.

Significant proton radiation exposure can be experienced by astronauts who are outside of the protective shield of the Earth's magnetosphere, such as an astronaut in-transit to, or located on, the Moon. However, the effects can be minimized if the astronauts are in a low-Earth orbit and remain confined to the most heavily shielded regions of their spacecraft. Proton radiation levels in low earth orbit increase with orbital inclination. Therefore, the closer a spacecraft approaches the polar regions, the greater the exposure to energetic proton radiation will be.

Spacecraft 
Energetic protons from SPEs can electrically charge spacecraft to levels that can damage electronic components. They can also cause electronic components to behave erratically. For example, solid state memory on spacecraft can be altered, which may cause data or software contamination and result in unexpected (phantom) spacecraft commands being executed. Energetic proton storms also destroy the efficiency of the solar panels that are designed to collect and convert sunlight to electricity. During years of exposure to energetic proton activity from the Sun, spacecraft can lose a substantial amount of electrical power that may require important instruments to be turned off.

When energetic protons strike the sensitive optical electronics in spacecraft (such as star trackers and other cameras) flashes occur in the images being captured. The effect can be so pronounced that during extreme events, it is not possible to obtain quality images of the Sun or stars. This can cause spacecraft to lose their orientation, which is critical if ground controllers are to maintain control.

Associated phenomena 

Major SPEs can be associated with geomagnetic storms that can cause widespread disruption to electrical grids. However, proton events themselves are not responsible for producing anomalies in power grids, nor are they responsible for producing geomagnetic storms. Power grids are only sensitive to fluctuations in the Earth's magnetic field.

See also 
 Heliophysics
 List of solar storms
 Solar energetic particles
 Space weather

Explanatory notes

References

External links 
 Solar Particle Events Affecting the Earth Environment 1976 - present
 SWPC S-scale
 SWPC alert descriptions
 Carrington Super Flare, NASA Science News, May 6, 2008

Solar phenomena
Space hazards